The 1977–78 season was Port Vale's 66th season of football in the Football League, and their eighth successive season (14th overall) in the Third Division. Finishing in 21st place, they were relegated to the Fourth Division. Roy Sproson was sacked in October after a poor start to the season, though things did not improve under his replacement Bobby Smith, despite Smith spending big money to bring in new players. Smith also left the club at the end of the season.

Overview

Third Division
The pre-season saw manager Roy Sproson attempt to re-sign Sammy Morgan for £12,000, however Morgan refused personal terms. Former Player of the Year David Harris also refused terms and demanded a transfer, so Terry Alcock re-joined on a month's trial to take his place. Three players arrived on free transfers: Jeff Hemmerman and Grahame McGifford from Hull City, and Bill Bentley from Blackpool. On a 28 June meeting, Sproson was severely criticized for his poor judgement of players and his seeming to place greater priority on his newsagent business than the club. Sproson did not attend the meeting, but was informed the board would review his position after fifteen games. The Football Association also hit the club with a £500 fine for their continuing problem with player indiscipline, despite Sproson's argument that no Vale players had been sent off in the last two years.

The season began poorly, though Harris returned to the first eleven and Alcock thus departed. Keeper John Connaughton picked up a knee injury, whilst a reporter from The Sentinel was allegedly told "I'll kill you" by a club official after he criticized the team in the paper. The reporter noted that "there is disenchantment in the air". The situated was calmed on 27 September, when Vale beat high-flying Colchester United 3–2 at Layer Road, reserve keeper Trevor Dance making a double penalty save. This was only a reprieve for Sproson however, as Vale would go the next fourteen league games without a victory, and the Vale Park faithful turned against the team. This run was not too damaging however, as eleven of the games were draws. Included in this was a club record streak of six home draws, lasting from 10 October to 27 December. Sproson complained of Mick Cullerton's attitude, and had to endure speculation of former Stoke City manager Tony Waddington taking his job. Sproson was sacked in October, and he rejected the offer of an executive position at the club. Colin Harper was made caretaker-manager. The board tried and failed to attract Bill McGarry to the vacant managerial position, and so advertised the position with a significant salary increase to attract applicants. On 17 November, Bobby Smith was sacked as Bury manager, and the next day walked into the Vale job. He appointed Dennis Butler as his assistant, as Harper left the club. Sproson also returned to Vale with an offer 'to help in any capacity'. Victory finally came on New Year's Eve with a 3–0 win over Rotherham United. Soon after this the 'Vale Lottery' was introduced, which proved to be a real money-spinner, and a five-a-side pitch was built for training.

In January, veteran defender Graham Hawkins was signed as a player-coach from Blackburn Rovers for £6,000. Forward Neville Chamberlain also joined the club as a professional, becoming the club's first black pro. John Froggatt also joined the club, signing from Colchester United for £10,000. Chairman Arthur McPherson celebrated this abandonment of frugality by declaring "we are going places". Chris Harper slated the board for their decisions, calling them 'berserk'. Froggatt scored fifteen seconds into his debut in a 4–0 win over Exeter City. However this would be as good as it got for both Froggatt and Vale that season. In February, Vale beat Fort Lauderdale Strikers in a friendly, but also started a five games sequence without a win. Ged Stenson arrived the next month from Everton for a 'bargain' £3,000, and John Lumsdon joined on loan from Stoke City. Vale improved, and were unbeaten in six of their seven March games, with Chamberlain scoring on his debut. Yet on 28 March they started a club-record streak of twelve home games without a win that would continue into the following season. Encouragement came from the youth side, who reached the Quarter Finals of the FA Youth Cup. With four games to go, Vale were point clear of the drop, however by losing all of their remaining games they doomed themselves to the Fourth Division.

They finished in 21st place with 36 points, three short of Rotherham United and safety. Their tally of 46 goals scored was the third-lowest in the division. They had failed to keep a clean sheet on their travels all season, achieving just one away win. Player of the Year Ken Beamish hit sixteen goals, far outscoring his rivals.

Finances
On the financial side, a loss of £1,575 was made. The massive transfer outlay was paid for by huge donations of £51,428 from the Sportsmen's Association and the Development Fund. The lottery also brought in £600 a week. Gate receipts had brought in £78,965, a downturn in attendance being outweighed by an increase in ticket prices. Seven players were handed free transfers, five of which were: Mick Cullerton and Grahame McGifford (Northwich Victoria); Derek Brownbill (Cleveland Cobras); Alan Lamb (Dundee); and Kevin Kennerley (Stafford Rangers). Manager Bobby Smith also departed, having taken the vacant position at Swindon Town – Vale received £10,500 in compensation. Dennis Butler rejected the opportunity to leave with him, and instead was appointed as Smith's replacement at Vale. Graham Hawkins became Butler's assistant.

Cup competitions
In the FA Cup, Smith's first game in charge was a goalless draw at Midland Counties League side Arnold. The replay in Burslem was won 5–2, the club's biggest win since January 1969. In the Second Round, Vale drew 1–1 with Walsall at Fellows Park, before losing the replay 3–1 after Connaughton allowed a speculative shot from 25 yards out to trickle through his hands. He later admitted "I deserve to be strung up!".

In the League Cup, Vale beat Preston North End 2–1 in the home leg, though the fixture was unsettled by crowd violence. Preston won the return leg at Deepdale, and also the replay at Edgeley Park, Stockport.

League table

Results
Port Vale's score comes first

Football League Third Division

Results by matchday

Matches

FA Cup

League Cup

Player statistics

Appearances

Top scorers

Transfers

Transfers in

Transfers out

Loans in

Loans out

References
Specific

General

Port Vale F.C. seasons
Port Vale